The 2019 season is PKNS's 6th season in the top flight of Malaysian football, the Malaysia Super League after being promoted from 2016 Malaysia Premier League.

Club officials

Players

 PS = President squad player

Transfers and contracts

In
1st leg

2nd leg

Out
1st leg

2nd leg

Loans out
1st leg

2nd leg

Loans in

Friendlies

Tour of Singapore (12 to 16 Jan 2019)

Competitions

Malaysia Super League

Tables

Matches

Malaysia FA Cup

Malaysia Cup

Group stage

Statistics

Appearances and goals
Correct as of match played on 17 September 2019

References 

PKNS F.C.
Malaysian football clubs 2019 season